Kalyani Nair is a singer from Chennai, India (born in thirupur, Tamilnadu). She is active in the Tamil cinema industry, Kollywood. As a schoolgirl, Kalyani first appeared on Television in an episode of Symphony on Kairali TV. One of her popular songs is Dora Dora Anbe Dora, from the movie Maasilamani where she sang the duet with Balram.

She is an undergraduate student of Economics at Ethiraj College for Women, Chennai, Tamil Nadu. Hariharan once described her voice as one with a bright future as she sang with him at a function.

Her uncle is Rambo . So she had the chance to learn Hindustani music. Currently at Chennai, her teacher is Binny Krishnakumar. She married one of her co-singers, V. Pradeep Kumar, who has sung many songs in Tamil movies. Their wedding was in Chennai and attended by many singers. She is the daughter-in-law of Rangaswamy

Kalyani has sung for Vidyasagar in 'Satyam' and 'Kochi Rajavu', and for Ouseppachan in 'Thaskaraveeran' and the popular 'Moollai Thirugum' in 'Kana Kandaen'. She has sung "Sogathai Solli Aszha" in Karuvarai Pookkal (the very first film about transgender people in India), a film with music composed by Thomas Rathnam.

She recently sang the song Aaraduguluntada in the Telugu movie Seethamma Vakitlo Sirimalle Chettu.

Film songs 
 Notable Songs

References

External links
The Pancham effect
Dora Dora Anbe Dora Lyrics

Living people
Indian women playback singers
Singers from Thiruvananthapuram
Ethiraj College for Women alumni
Year of birth missing (living people)
Tamil playback singers
Women musicians from Kerala
21st-century Indian singers
21st-century Indian women singers